Henrik Nyholm Madsen (born 25 February 1983) is a retired Danish footballer. He previously played at FC Vestsjælland.

References

External links
Official Danish Superliga stats
Eliteprospects Profile

Living people
1983 births
Danish men's footballers
Denmark youth international footballers
Danish 1st Division players
HB Køge players
Aarhus Gymnastikforening players
Næstved Boldklub players
FC Vestsjælland players

Association football midfielders